John Beaufort, Marquess of Dorset, Earl of Dorset (b. 1441 – d. 4 May 1471) was a scion of the Beaufort family, who fought for the Lancastrians in the Wars of the Roses.

Origins
He was the third son of Edmund Beaufort, 2nd Duke of Somerset and his wife, Lady Eleanor Beauchamp, daughter of Richard de Beauchamp, Earl of Warwick.

Wars of the Roses 
His father was killed in 1455 at the First Battle of St Albans.When his eldest brother, Henry Beaufort, 3rd Duke of Somerset, was killed fighting for Lancaster in 1464 at the Battle of Hexham, the next brother, Edmund, succeeded to the Dukedom, and John became "Marquess of Dorset" and "Earl of Dorset", courtesy titles granted to the Beaufort heir-apparent or heir-presumptive. These titles were not recognized by King Edward IV, of the House of York. John had been in exile since 1461, first in Burgundy and then France. When Henry VI of Lancaster reclaimed the throne in October 1470, John returned with his brother Edmund. But a few months later, Henry was driven from the throne again, and the Lancastrians were on the run.

John was killed in the Battle of Tewkesbury on 4 May 1471, while fighting beside Edmund, who was captured and beheaded two days later.  John left behind no issue and was never married. With the death of John and Edmund, the legitimate male line of the Beauforts ended.

Ancestry

References

1441 births
1471 deaths
John Beaufort, Marquess of Dorset
People of the Wars of the Roses
Younger sons of dukes